Atractophora is a monotypic genus of red algae of the family Atractophoraceae (within the Order Atractophorales). It only contains one known species Atractophora hypnoides .

It is found in the European Atlantic Ocean, close to the coasts of Great Britain and Denmark. Tt has a very simple type of vegetative growth. It has lateral filaments which are at an irregular sequence, becoming quadriverticillate (type of branching pattern). A second whorl can be produced under the first growth, especially in tips of fertile thalli (green shoots).

References

 

Red algae genera
Florideophyceae